The action of 17 July 1944 was a submarine engagement of World War II. It resulted in the sinking of the Japanese Navy's Kadai class submarine I-166 in the Strait of Malacca by the British Royal Navy submarine .

Operating for the first time with the Eastern Fleet at Colombo in Ceylon, Commander Bill King on 13 July had put himself in a position known as One Fathom bank in order to intercept Japanese traffic between Penang and Singapore. They waited until the 17th when submerged, the ASDIC operator alerted King to the sound of propellers, and the watch soon spotted a Japanese submarine; that being I-166.

Action
Despite limited visibility because of mist, Telemachus tracked I-166 for 30 minutes, waited until it was less than a mile distant and reached the firing point beam on. At 07:20 King fired a spread of six Torpex warhead torpedoes at 1,500 yards, and then tried to swing the boat to fire her stern torpedoes. This manoeuvre however, failed and Telemachus lost control and briefly broke surface. Ninety-two seconds after the launch however, one torpedo hit the stern of I-166. The Japanese boat sank immediately and eighty-eight men were killed. Lt Suwa and the navigating officer were blown overboard. Seven hours later they were picked up by Malayan fishermen.

Soon after the sinking the Japanese attempted to intercept and sink Telemachus but without success. Telemachus returned to Colombo.
King was awarded a Distinguished Service Cross (DSC) on 16 January 1945 "For outstanding courage, skill and determination in one of H.M. Submarines in successful patrols in Far Eastern waters" (specifically the sinking of the I-166).

References
Citations

Bibliography

Conflicts in 1944
World War II operations and battles of the Southeast Asia Theatre
A
Naval battles of World War II involving Japan
Submarine warfare in World War II
1944 in British Malaya
Japan–United Kingdom military relations
July 1944 events